Oswald Jacob Groenings (later Birkbeck, 20 May 1880 – 24 March 1965) was a British track and field athlete who competed in the 1908 Summer Olympics. He was born in Middlesbrough and died in London.

In 1908 he was eliminated in the semi-finals of the 400 metre hurdles competition after finishing second in his heat. He also participated in the 110 metre hurdles event and was eliminated in the semi-finals again after finishing fourth in his heat.

References

External links
Sports Reference profile

1880 births
1965 deaths
Sportspeople from Middlesbrough
English male hurdlers
Olympic athletes of Great Britain
Athletes (track and field) at the 1908 Summer Olympics